Radio BAR is a public radio station in Sunyani, the capital town of the Brong Ahafo Region of Ghana. The station is owned and run by the state broadcaster - the Ghana Broadcasting Corporation.

References

Radio stations in Ghana
Brong-Ahafo Region
Mass media in Sunyani